The Comunidade Intermunicipal do Alto Minho is an administrative division in northern Portugal. It is situated between the Minho River and Lima River. It was created in October 2008. Since January 2015, Alto Minho is also the designation of a NUTS3 subregion of Norte Region, that covers the same area as the intermunicipal community. The main town of the intermunicipal community is Viana do Castelo. The intermunicipal community is coterminous with the Viana do Castelo District. The population in 2011 was 244,836, in an area of 2,218.84 km².

It borders to the north the Galicia autonomous region in Spain and to the south with the Cávado intermunicipal community. It is an area with a strong gastronomic identity and produces a specific type of wine called Vinho Verde (young wine).

Municipalities
It is composed of ten municipalities:

References

External links
Official website CIM Alto Minho

Intermunicipal communities of Portugal
Norte Region, Portugal